Parascutellinia is a genus of fungi in the family Pyronemataceae. It was circumscribed by mycologist Mirko Svrček in 1975, with P. violacea as the type species.

References

Pyronemataceae
Pezizales genera